Shorea malibato is a species of plant in the family Dipterocarpaceae. It is endemic to the Philippines.

References

malibato
Endemic flora of the Philippines
Trees of the Philippines
Vulnerable flora of Asia
Taxonomy articles created by Polbot